The Redemption (Italian:Il riscatto) is a 1924 Italian silent film directed by Guglielmo Zorzi and starring Carmen Boni.

Cast
 Carmen Boni 
 Andrea Habay 
 Arnold Kent 
 Elena Lunda 
 Alfredo Martinelli 
 Enrico Scatizzi
 Mary Cleo Tarlarini

References

Bibliography
 Stewart, John. Italian film: a who's who. McFarland, 1994.

External links

1924 films
1920s Italian-language films
Films directed by Guglielmo Zorzi
Italian silent feature films
Italian black-and-white films